The Norwegian Aviation Museum was opened by King Harald V on May 15, 1994. Situated in Bodø, Nordland the building is shaped like a huge propeller and contains both a civil and a military collection of aircraft.

Exhibits and collections 

The exhibits of the Norwegian Aviation museum tells the story of aviation with a focus on the Norwegian history - from the early beginning all the way to present time. The collection is divided into a military section and a civil section.

Military aircraft on display

Avro 504K Dyak – British trainer aircraft
Bell UH-1B Iroquois - 64-14079/079 - American medium heavy tactical transport helicopter
Canadair CF-104 Starfighter - 104802 (earlier 12801) - Canadian interceptor aircraft
Cessna L-19A/O-1A Bird Dog - 50-1712 - American observation aircraft
Cessna T-37B Tweet - 57-2247 - American trainer aircraft
Consolidated PBY-5A Catalina - BU 46645 - American Maritime patrol and search-and-rescue aircraft
De Havilland DH.82 Tiger Moth - 88210 - British trainer aircraft
De Havilland DH.98 Mosquito - British multirole combat aircraft
De Havilland DH.100 Vampire - V0184 - British fighter aircraft
Fairchild PT-19 Cornell - American trainer aircraft
Focke-Wulf Fw 190 A-3/U3 - NR 2219/Black 3 - German Ground attack aircraft
Fokker C.V-D - 349 - Dutch aerial reconnaissance and light bomber aircraft
Gloster Gladiator II - N5641 - British fighter aircraft
Hawker Hurricane Mk II (Fiberglass replica) - British fighter aircraft
Junkers Ju 88 A-4 (Displayed as crashed) - 4D+AM - German multirole combat aircraft
Kjeller F.F.9 Kaje I - 66 - Norwegian trainer aircraft
Lockheed U-2 - 56-6953 - American reconnaissance aircraft 
North American F-86F Sabre - 53-1206 - American fighter aircraft
North American T-6/J Harvard - 52-8570 - American trainer aircraft
Northrop F-5A Freedom Fighter - tail no. 134 - American fighter aircraft
Northrop RF-5A(G) Freedom Fighter - tail no. 102 - American Aerial reconnaissance aircraft
Petlyakov Pe-2FT (Cockpit section displayed) - 16/141 - Soviet light bomber aircraft
Piper L-18C Super Cub - 53-4835 - American light aerial reconnaissance aircraft
Republic F-84G Thunderjet - 52-8465 - American fighter-bomber aircraft
Republic RF-84F Thunderflash - 51-17047 - American aerial reconnaissance aircraft
SAAB 91B-2 Safir - 91-337 - Swedish trainer aircraft
Supermarine Spitfire LF.Mk.IXe - MH350 - British fighter aircraft

Civil aircraft on display

The indoor civil exhibition is currently undergoing a major rebuild and is unavailable for the general public until December 10, 2016.
North American Rockwell 1121 Jet Commander (on display outside) - American Business jet

Location debate controversy 
For decades the decision on where to locate the Norwegian national Aviation Museum sparked heated discussions. For a long time the aviation community working close to the Norwegian Armed Forces Aircraft Collection at Gardermoen and the aviation community in Bodø debated intensely against each other in order to persuade politicians to locate the museum at their home turf. On March 31, 1992 the Norwegian parliament, the Storting, decided to build the museum in Bodø.

Location 
The Norwegian aviation museum is situated in Bodø, Northern Norway. The museum is straddled across the street of 'Olav V gate'. When travelling by car from the nearby Bodø Airport in the direction of Fauske you will pass under the museum. Nearby points of interest are Bodø Spektrum (A sports complex with water park) and the shopping center of City Nord.

See also 

List of aerospace museums

References

Buildings and structures in Bodø
Museums in Nordland
Aerospace museums in Norway
A
Military and war museums in Norway